Sir Alexander William George Herder Grantham, GCMG (15 March 1899 – 4 October 1978) was a British colonial administrator who governed Hong Kong and Fiji.

Early life, colonial administration career
Grantham was born on 15 March 1899 and was educated at Wellington, the Royal Military College, Sandhurst, and Pembroke College, Cambridge.

He was gazetted in the 18th Hussars in 1917 and joined the Colonial Administrative Service in Hong Kong in 1922. He was the Deputy Clerk of the Legislative Council of Hong Kong for a short period in 1933. In 1934, he was called to the Bar at the Inner Temple and attended the Imperial Defence College later that year.

Grantham became Colonial Secretary of Bermuda from 1935 to 1938, and of Jamaica from 1938 to 1941. He then served as Chief Secretary of Nigeria from 1941 to 1944 and as Governor of Fiji and High Commissioner for the Western Pacific from 1945 to 1947.

Immediately after his tenure as High Commissioner ended, he became Governor of Hong Kong, until 1957. He opposed his predecessor, Sir Mark Young's proposal of expanding social services on the grounds that the local Chinese population cared little about social welfare. Instead, he proposed the election of Unofficial members of the Legislative Council among British subjects only with the Governor holding reserved power to override LegCo decisions.

Legacy of governorship

His tenure marked the beginning of a unitary housing policy by the Hong Kong Government. In December 1953, a fire burned down a large slum area in Shek Kip Mei, Kowloon, killing nine and leaving many homeless. It was under Grantham's administration that the government began to build settlement houses for the homeless. From that point on, the government was deeply involved in low-cost public housing programmes that allowed many Hong Kong people who could not afford to own a flat to live in government-owned housing estates at relatively low cost. The housing programme eventually evolved over time to allow people to buy low-cost housing and receive favourable loans to buy their own houses.

Honours
 Honorary Fellow, Pembroke College, Cambridge
 Honorary Doctorate of Laws degree, Hong Kong University
 CMG, 1941
 KCMG, 1945
 GCMG, 1951

Personal life
Grantham grew up partly in Tientsin where his father practiced Law, both his father and brother was killed in World War I. His mother then remarried Johan Wilhelm Normann Munthe and the family moved tho Beijing. He was married twice. His first marriage, in 1925, was to the well-travelled Maurine Samson, daughter of the late Amos Roland Samson and Liberty "Libby" Cole (Neal) of Champaign County, Illinois. Born in Lincoln, Nebraska, she had lived in Boise, Seattle, San Francisco and Honolulu before their marriage. The Governor's official yacht, a Hong Kong health clinic and a locomotive were all named "Lady Maurine" after her. After she died in 1970, Grantham married Mrs M. E. Lumley in 1972. Grantham died on 4 October 1978.

Honours
 :
 Companion of the Order of St Michael and St George (C.M.G.) (1941)
 Knight Commander of the Order of St Michael and St George (K.C.M.G.) - Sir (1945)
 Knight Grand Cross of the Order of St Michael and St George (G.C.M.G.) - Sir (1951)

Places/facilities named after him
Grantham Hospital in Aberdeen, Hong Kong
Grantham College of Education in Hong Kong
Alexander Grantham, a fireboat of the Fire Services Department of the Government of Hong Kong
Sir Alexander, an EMD G12 Diesel-electric locomotive No. 51, introduced in Hong Kong in 1955 and on display at the Hong Kong Railway Museum

Bibliography

See also
 History of Hong Kong

References

External links 

 

|-

Chief secretaries (British Empire)
Graduates of the Royal College of Defence Studies
Military personnel from London
High Commissioners for the Western Pacific
1899 births
1978 deaths
Governors of Fiji
Governors of Hong Kong
Chief Secretaries of Nigeria
Colonial Secretaries of Jamaica
British Army personnel of World War I
18th Royal Hussars officers
Members of the Inner Temple
Graduates of the Royal Military College, Sandhurst
Companions of the Order of St Michael and St George
Knights Commander of the Order of St Michael and St George
Knights Grand Cross of the Order of St Michael and St George
People educated at Wellington College, Berkshire
Alumni of Pembroke College, Cambridge
People from Surbiton
20th-century Hong Kong people
20th-century British politicians